Cheiridopsis turbinata is a succulent plant from South Africa.

Description 
Cheiridopsis turbinata is a succulent which forms a robust, essentially stemless cushion. The paired leaves are a dull, deep green and are sharply keeled.

Flowers are solitarily borne and are present in August and September. They are large with yellow petals. The fruits are 10-14-locular.

Distribution and habitat 
This species is endemic to the Northern Cape and Western Cape of South Africa. It grows on shale flats and gneiss outcrops between Geelvlei, Steinkopf (and further north) and Springbok.

Conservation 
This species is classified as being of least concern by the South African National Biodiversity Institute.

References 

Flora of South Africa
Plants described in 1929
Namaqualand
turbinata